The Eastern Herzegovinian dialect (Serbo-Croatian: istočnohercegovački / источнохерцеговачки) is the most widespread subdialect of the Shtokavian dialect of Serbo-Croatian, both by territory and the number of speakers. It is the dialectal basis for all modern literary Serbo-Croatian standards: Bosnian, Croatian, Serbian, and Montenegrin (the latter only partially codified).

Distribution
It covers large areas of Croatia, Bosnia-Herzegovina, Serbia and Montenegro. It is also spoken in four villages in White Carniola, Slovenia (Miliči, Bojanci, Marindol and Paunoviči), the inhabitants of which are descendants of Uskoks. It is composed of two larger zones that are territorially separated:
 Southeastern zone, where it originated from (eastern Herzegovina, western Montenegro, western Serbia, eastern Bosnia, Posavinan Podrinje)
 Northwestern zone (western and northwestern Bosnia, northern Dalmatia with Gorski Kotar, narrower strips of Croatia, parts of Slavonia and Baranja, White Carniola and Žumberak)
As can be seen from the map, the southeastern zone is territorially compact and continuous, while the northwestern zone is broken, discontinuous and interspersed with areas where other Shtokavian dialects are spoken.

Being spoken on such a large area, Eastern Herzegovinian comes into contact with all of the other Shtokavian dialects, except those of the Prizren-Timok zone, and also on northwest with the dialects of two other Western South Slavic (Croatian) dialects: Chakavian and Kajkavian. It is also spoken in a few enclaves on Chakavian and Kajkavian areas, and in several contact points it borders with Slovene dialects. On the north it borders with Hungary, where it is also spoken in a few enclaves along the border near Danube, as well as on the outskirts of Budapest.

On the south this dialect covers the area between the river of Neretva and River Dubrovačka inlet, the area of Dubrovnik and Dubrovnikan littoral, eastern half of the Pelješac peninsula, the island of Mljet, Konavle and Herzegovinian area, along the Adriatic cost all the way to Risno in the Bay of Kotor. On the territory of modern Montenegro it covers Old Herzegovina with Grahovo, northern Plješivica, Župa, Lukovo, Drobnjaci, Uskoci, Rovci, Kolašin and Morača.

During the turbulent period of Bosnian war 1992–1995, marked by large-scale migrations of the native population, Eastern Herzegovinian speeches have spread significantly on the area of Bosnia-Herzegovina. During the Croatian War of Independence 1991–1995 however, the number of Eastern Herzegovinian speakers significantly dropped, following the flight of some 300,000 Croatian Serbs all of whom spoke the dialect. In the post war-period, as the refugees return to their homes, number of speakers at the territory of Croatia has been increasing steadily.

Notes

References
 
 

Dialects of Serbo-Croatian
Serbian dialects
Croatian language
Bosnian language
Montenegrin language
Herzegovina